Bacilos is a music group based in Miami, Florida, US. A leading practitioner of latin pop, the band had several hits on the Billboard Latin charts and had considerable success in the Latin Grammies, most notably, their album Caraluna which won the 2003 Grammy Award for Best Latin Pop Album, and album Sin Vergüenza which was nominated in 2005 for the same award.

Band history

The band was formed in 1997 by three students of the University of Miami. Originally a quartet, the band drew influences from Cuban folk singer Silvio Rodríguez and Argentinian rock singer Fito Páez. The band eventually became a trio consisting of Colombian singer and guitarist Jorge Villamizar, Brazilian bassist André Lopes and Puerto Rican percussionist José Javier Freire before releasing an independent album Madera in 1999.

Bacilos signed with Warner Music in 2000. The self-titled album was nominated for two Latin Grammy awards and went gold in Colombia. The single Tabaco Y Chanel was widely played on Latin radio stations and the success of their major label debut earned them a slot as support artist on a world tour by Spanish artist Alejandro Sanz.

Their 2002 Caraluna album added to their reputation winning a Grammy for best Latin pop album and making the Billboard Latin album charts. The album also won best album at the Latin Grammies and their song Mi Primer Millón won best tropical song. The single Caraluna went to No. 1 in Chile, top 10 in Argentina and charted in the world and Billboard Latin charts in late 2002 and early 2003.

Mi Primer Millón, a humorous account of trying to make it in the music industry, again went top 10 in Chile and made the Billboard and world Latin music charts in 2003. Solo un segundo was the third single from the album going top 10 in Argentina and top 20 in Chile. Bacilos also featured on a duet with Celso Piña which made the Chilean Top 20 in May 2004.

Sin Verguenza was released in late 2004. The first single Pasos de Gigante went to number 1 in Argentina, No. 2 in Chile and made top 10 on Billboard's Latin singles charts in late 2004.  It was nominated for a Grammy award for best Latin pop album.

The band announced that they would break up and completed their final tour in the United States on December 15, 2006, when they played at La Covacha, in Miami.

Their final live show was on February 22, 2007, at the Festival Internacional de la Canción de Viña del Mar, in Chile. 

In October 2017, the band decided for a reunion and released their latest hit, "Por Hacerme el Bueno". In August 2018, the band released their fourth studio album "¿Donde Nos Quedamos?".

In April of 2021, the band released their fifth studio album, "Abecedario," which includes two re-recorded hits, Caraluna featuring Carlos Vives, and Tobacco y Channel with Morat.

Members

 Singer and guitarist: Jorge Villamizar (born c. 1971, in Colombia)
 Bassist: André Lopes (born c. 1976, in Brazil)

Discography

 Madera (1999)
 Bacilos (2000)
 Caraluna (2002)
 Sin Vergüenza (2004)
 Grandes Éxitos (2006)
 ¿Donde Nos Quedamos? (2018)
Abecedario (2021)

Awards and nominations

Grammy Awards
The Grammy Award is an accolade by the National Academy of Recording Arts and Sciences of the United States to recognize outstanding achievement on the music industry. Bacilos received an award from two nominations.

|-
| 2005 || Sin Vergüenza || Best Latin Pop Album || 
|-
| 2003 || Caraluna || Best Latin Pop Album || 
|-

Latin Grammy Awards
A Latin Grammy Award is an accolade by the Latin Academy of Recording Arts & Sciences to recognize outstanding achievement in the music industry. Bacilos received three awards from eight nominations.

|-
| style="text-align:center;" rowspan="2"| 2001 || Bacilos || Best New Artist || 
|-
|Bacilos || Best Pop Album by a Duo or Group with Vocals || 
|-
| style="text-align:center;" rowspan="6"| 2003 || Caraluna || Album of the Year || 
|-
|rowspan="2"| "Mi Primer Millón" || Record of the Year || 
|-
| rowspan="2"| Song of the Year || 
|-
|"Caraluna" || 
|-
|Caraluna || Best Pop Album by a Duo or Group with Vocals || 
|-
|"Mi Primer Millón" || Best Tropical Song || 
|-
| 2005 || Sin Vergüenza || Best Pop Album by a Duo or Group with Vocals || 
|-

References

External links
Bacilos Official Website
Bacilos Official Label Site – Free music online

Lyric And Translation
Tabaco Y Chanel, Hebrew translation

Latin pop music groups
Grammy Award winners
Latin Grammy Award winners
Musical groups from Miami
Musical groups established in 1997
Musical groups disestablished in 2007
Warner Music Latina artists
Pop-folk music groups